USS Carson City (PF-50), a  in commission from 1944 to 1945, thus far has been the only ship of the United States Navy to be named for Carson City, Nevada. She later served in the Soviet Navy as EK-20 and in the Japan Maritime Self-Defense Force as JDS Sakura (PF-10), JDS Sakura (PF-290) and as YAC-16.

Construction and commissioning
Originally classified as a patrol gunboat, PG-158, Carson City was reclassified as a patrol frigate, PF-50, on 15 April 1943. Constructed under a Maritime Commission contract, she was launched on 13 November 1943, by Consolidated Steel Corporation at Wilmington, California, sponsored by Mrs. C. B. Austin, and commissioned on 24 March 1944.

Service history

US Navy, World War II, 1944-1945
Manned by a United States Coast Guard crew, Carson City departed Los Angeles, California, on 19 July 1944, for Espiritu Santo and Milne Bay, New Guinea, where on 13 August 1944, she reported for patrol and escort duty in the New Guinea area with the United States Seventh Fleet. She took part in the unopposed landings on Morotai on 16 September 1944, then took part in guarding ships, men, and supplies being assembled for the landings on Leyte in the Philippine Islands. She herself sailed for Leyte Gulf from Humboldt Bay, New Guinea, on 16 October 1944, supporting the first wave of reinforcements for the Northern Attack Force at Leyte. On 22 October 1944, she accompanied her charges into the landing area, and next day began a voyage escorting the empty ships back to Humboldt Bay.

After reaching Humboldt Bay, Carson City resumed convoy escort duty in the New Guinea area, shuttling to Wakde, Biak, Noemfoor, Sansapor, Morotai, and Mios Woendi until 26 November 1944, when she departed New Guinea for Pearl Harbor, Territory of Hawaii, where she underwent an overhaul. Upon its completion, she steamed north for duty with the Alaskan Sea Frontier at Dutch Harbor, Territory of Alaska, where she reported on 12 January 1945 and began patrol and escort duties in Alaskan waters. Selected for transfer to the Soviet Navy in Project Hula – a secret program for the transfer of US Navy ships to the Soviet Navy at Cold Bay, Alaska, in anticipation of the Soviet Union joining the war against Japan – Carson City proceeded to Cold Bay in August 1945 and began training her new Soviet crew.

Soviet Navy, 1945–1949

Commissioned into the Soviet Navy immediately, Carson City was designated as a storozhevoi korabl ("escort ship") and renamed EK-20 in Soviet service. She soon departed Cold Bay bound for Petropavlovsk-Kamchatsky in the Soviet Union, where she served as a patrol vessel in the Soviet Far East.

In February 1946, the United States began negotiations for the return of ships loaned to the Soviet Union for use during World War II. On 8 May 1947, United States Secretary of the Navy James V. Forrestal informed the United States Department of State that the United States Department of the Navy wanted 480 of the 585 combatant ships it had transferred to the Soviet Union for World War II use returned, EK-20 among them. Negotiations for the return of the ships were protracted, but on 1 November 1949, the Soviet Union finally returned EK-20 to the U.S. Navy at Yokosuka, Japan.

Japan Maritime Self-Defense Force, 1953–1971

Sakura was redesignated PF-290 on 1 September 1957. She was reclassified as an "auxiliary stock craft" (YAC) and renamed YAC-16 on 31 March 1966. She was decommissioned on 31 March 1971 and returned to U.S. custody for disposal on 6 August 1971. Her final disposition is unknown.

According to some reports, ex-USS Carson City was sold for scrap following her return from Japanese control, and was scrapped by a breaker in Taiwan.  The ships bell is currently displayed inside the City Hall of Carson City, Nevada, along with the ship's commissioning pennant.

Awards
The US Navy awarded Carson City two battle stars for her World War II service.

References

External links 
 
 hazegray.org: USS Carson City
 

 

Tacoma-class frigates
Ships built in Los Angeles
1943 ships
World War II frigates and destroyer escorts of the United States
Tacoma-class frigates of the Soviet Navy
World War II frigates of the Soviet Union
Cold War frigates of the Soviet Union
Tacoma-class frigates of the Japan Maritime Self-Defense Force
Ships transferred under Project Hula